G. M. S. Samaraweera (1937 - 18 May 2006) was a Sri Lankan politician and High Court Judge. the 5th Governor of North Central Province. He was appointed on 18 August 1998 succeeding Maithripala Senanayake and was Governor until 18 August 2003. He was succeeded by Jagath Balasuriya.

Samaraweera was educated at the Holy Family Convent, Anuradhapura and S. Thomas' College, Bandarawela and S. Thomas' College, Gurutalawa, after which he entered the Colombo Law College graduating as an advocate, and later joining the Army.

References

Governors of North Central Province, Sri Lanka
1937 births
2006 deaths